Camellia pubipetala is a species of plant in the family Theaceae. It is endemic to China.  It is threatened by habitat loss.

References

Endemic flora of China
pubipetala
Vulnerable plants
Taxonomy articles created by Polbot